Lysimachia azorica is a species of flowering plant in the family Primulaceae. It is endemic to the Azores, Portugal and is commonly found in woods, shrubland, forest plantations, embankments, roadsides and paths, in Sphagnum formations, at altitudes generally above . It is present in all of the nine Azorean islands.

References

azorica
Endemic flora of the Azores